2-Hexoxyethanol or 2-(Hexyloxy)ethanol is a glycol ether that has a chemical formula of C8H18O2.

Uses 
2-Hexoxyethanol is used by professional workers (widespread uses), consumers, in re-packing or re-formulation,  in manufacturing, and at industrial sites. It is used as high-boiling solvent. It also serves as an intermediate for neopentanoate and hexyloxyethyl phosphate. It serves as a coalescing agent in cleaners and latex paints. 

Other uses of 2-Hexoxyethanol are:

 Sealants
 Adhesives
 Coating products
 Finger Paints
 Fillers
 Anti-freeze products
 Plasters
 Putties
 Lubricants
 Modelling Clay
 Greases
 Automotive care products
 Machine wash liquids/detergents
 Air fresheners
 Fragrances
 Other outdoor use

Hazards 
According to the European Chemicals Agency, it is classified as harmful when in contact with skin and when swallowed. It can also cause skin burns and serious eye damage. 

2-Hexoxyethanol was also known to cause kidney injury and depression. It is also a severe respiratory tract irritant. It may also have blood effects.  It may enter the body through ingestion, aerosol inhalation, and through the skin.

It may form explosive peroxides. It can react violently with strong oxidants.

It is classified as a green circle product EPA Safer Choice meaning it is of low concern.

References

External Links 
https://contaminantdb.ca/contaminants/CHEM009405

https://pubchem.ncbi.nlm.nih.gov/compound/2-_Hexyloxy_ethanol#section=CAS

https://webbook.nist.gov/cgi/inchi/InChI=1S/C8H18O2/c1-2-3-4-5-7-10-8-6-9/h9H,2-8H2,1H3

Glycol ethers